Black and White is a ballet made by New York City Ballet ballet master, subsequently ballet master in chief, Peter Martins to some of Michael Torke's eponymous music which was commissioned for City Ballet's American Music Festival; the premiere took place on 7 May 1988 at the New York State Theater, Lincoln Center. Black and White was the second in a series of collaborations between the choreographer and composer.

Original cast
 Heather Watts
Jock Soto

See also 
Ash
Echo
Ecstatic Orange

Articles  
Sunday NY Times by Anna Kisselgoff, July 7, 1991

Reviews  
  
NY Times by Anne Kisselgoff, May 9, 1988
 
NY Times by Jack Anderson, February 22, 1990

Ballets by Peter Martins
Ballets by Michael Torke
1988 ballet premieres
New York City Ballet American Music Festival
New York City Ballet repertory